Thomas R. Smith may refer to:

 Thomas Roger Smith (1830–1903), English architect
 Thomas Rudolph Smith (1869–1958), English surgeon
 Thomas R. Smith (poet)

See also

 R. Thomas Smith